Fare zone 4 is an outer zone of Transport for London's zonal fare system used for calculating the price of tickets for travel on the London Underground, London Overground, Docklands Light Railway and, since 2007, on National Rail services.

List of stations 

The following stations are within zone 4:

Changes
January 2000: Beckton, Cyprus, Gallions Reach and Beckton Park (DLR) from Zone 4 to Zone 3
January 2004: Crystal Palace from Zone 4 to Zone 3/4 boundary
January 2007: Roding Valley, Chigwell, Grange Hill, Hainault, Fairlop and Barkingside from Zone 5 to Zone 4.
June 2019: Removal of Angel Road and addition of Meridian Water
May 2022: Addition of Woolwich
July 2022: Addition of Barking Riversode

See also

References